Bobby Nicol (11 May 1936 – 11 July 2012) was a Scottish footballer, who played for Hibernian, Barnsley, Berwick Rangers and Toronto City.

In the summer of 1962, he played abroad in the Eastern Canada Professional Soccer League with Toronto City. In 1964, he returned to play for Toronto City. In 1966, he signed with league rivals Toronto Roma. The following season he re-signed with Toronto Roma to play in the National Soccer League. In 1968, he continued playing in the National Soccer League with the Toronto Ukrainians.

References

External links 

1936 births
2012 deaths
Footballers from Edinburgh
Scottish footballers
Association football wing halves
Scottish Football League players
English Football League players
Eastern Canada Professional Soccer League players
Canadian National Soccer League players
Hibernian F.C. players
Barnsley F.C. players
Berwick Rangers F.C. players
Scottish expatriate footballers
Toronto City players
Toronto Roma players
Expatriate soccer players in Canada
Edinburgh City F.C. (1928) players
Scotland under-23 international footballers
Scottish expatriate sportspeople in Canada
Toronto Ukrainians players